Pierre Humbert (1848–1919) was a French architect.

Works 

Humbert was born in Uckange to a noble family.

He built many buildings and "hôtels particuliers" (private homes) in Paris and other European cities, such as Brussels for the aristocracy and the upper class of the time, such the prince of Caraman-Chimay, the duke des Cars or the Schneider family.

He especially built many buildings in the Champs-Elysées  area and in the 16th arrondissement of Paris.

He is the father of the French architect Maurice Humbert, with whom he restored many castles, including Napoléon's Château de Malmaison.

See also
Place des États-Unis

Sources 
 Françoise Talon, « Les palaces », in Les Champs-Élysées et leur quartier, Paris, 1988, p. 88,
 Monique Eleb, Anne Debarre "Architecture de la vie privée Paris 1880-1914 "
 Anne Debarre-Blanchard "L'Invention de l'habitation moderne, Paris, 1880-1914"

1848 births
1919 deaths
19th-century French architects
People from Moselle (department)